Tommy Andersson (born 3 February 1950) is a former Swedish footballer.

Honours

Club
Malmö FF
Allsvenskan: 1970, 1971, 1974, 1977

References

1950 births
Swedish footballers
Malmö FF players
Allsvenskan players
Living people
Association football forwards